Don't Nod Entertainment SA (trade name: Don't Nod, formerly Dontnod Entertainment) is a French video game developer based in Paris. Founded in June 2008, it started development on Remember Me (2013). Because of its poor return on investment, Don't Nod entered "judicial reorganisation" in 2013. With the help of French agency funding, it signed Life Is Strange (2015) with publisher Square Enix Europe in 2014, whose successful release raised Don't Nod's industry status. In May 2018, Don't Nod went public on the Euronext Growth market. Other games they have developed include Vampyr, The Awesome Adventures of Captain Spirit, Life Is Strange 2, Twin Mirror, and Tell Me Why.

History 

Dontnod Entertainment was founded by Hervé Bonin, Aleksi Briclot, Alain Damasio, Oskar Guilbert and Jean-Maxime Moris on 1 May 2008, alongside other former Criterion Games, Ubisoft and Electronic Arts staff. Originally based in Quartier des Quinze-Vingts in the 12th arrondissement, the studio moved into a new office in Quartier de la Villette in the 19th arrondissement to accommodate the company's growth in late 2008. The studio used Unreal Engine 3 for their first game, working with Epic Games' engineering team which leading to Epic extending Dontnod's UE3 evaluation and has used the engine for all of its games.

The developer's debut title was Remember Me, which would at first be a PlayStation 3-exclusive role-playing game, but was dropped by publisher Sony Interactive Entertainment in 2011 on account of cuts in funding. It was presented at Gamescom the same year to attract another publishing deal; the following year, Capcom acquired the rights and reimagined it as an action-adventure game, released on multiple platforms to mixed reviews and mediocre sales. In 2013, Dontnod was the most subsidised studio with 600 000€ aid by the French agency Centre national du cinéma et de l'image animée (CNC). Including aid for a new intellectual property (IP) project codenamed "What if?" (later Life is Strange) for 200 000€. On 28 January 2014, Dontnod filed for redressement judiciaire ("judicial reorganisation"), a form of receivership in France; the proceeding was finalised in February 2018. The proceeding filing was discovered by Factornews and some media outlets reported it as Dontnod filing for bankruptcy as a result of the poor sales of Remember Me. Dontnod responded to these reports explaining that they were in the process of "judicial reorganisation" and denying bankruptcy. In June 2014, Dontnod announced that they were working with publisher Square Enix Europe on a new game, which was later announced as Life Is Strange and released in 2015 over the course of five instalments. It was initially thought of as a full-length title that Dontnod would self-publish, but became episodic at Square Enix's behest. The game received generally favourable reviews according to Metacritic, accolade listings, and as of May 2017 was purchased by over three million players. The critical and commercial success of Life Is Strange caused Dontnod to be solicited by publishers, whereas they previously had to pursue publishers themselves.

Dontnod announced in July 2016 that it had entered into a partnership with Hesaw, a Parisian game studio in which Guilbert also held a management role, that saw the latter renamed  but remained an independent entity. In April 2018, Dontnod registered with the French stock market regulator Autorité des marchés financiers to become a public company. This came after a turnover of €9.7 million in 2017, a 33-percent increase from the previous year. The subscription period opened on 3 May 2018, with the first day of trading on 23 May. Listed on Euronext PME (Euronext Growth), Dontnod raised the intended €20.1 million. 25 percent of the funds were spent on finding another studio to partner with; according to Guilbert, the rest would allow further project investment as well as improvement and optimisation of production pipelines, with an internal motion capture studio cited among possibilities. Despite Dontnod's public listing, Guilbert, together with investor Kostadin Yanev, intended to keep control over the company. Around this time, the company employed 166 staff members. The studio subsequently acquired Dontnod Eleven and absorbed its operations in June 2018. Dontnod released Vampyr with Focus Home Interactive, an action role-playing game, on 5 June 2018. 70% of the studio's 120 employees (in 2016) were devoted to the development of Vampyr, many of whom had worked on Life Is Strange. The Awesome Adventures of Captain Spirit, set within the Life Is Strange universe, was announced at E3 2018 and released the same month. Dontnod started developing Life Is Strange 2 in early 2016, after its predecessor proved financially successful, with the first episode published on 27 September 2018 and the last on 3 December 2019.

Dontnod worked with Xbox Game Studios on Tell Me Why, a 2020 episodic adventure game. Also in 2020, Dontnod published its first self-owned IP, Twin Mirror co-developed with Shibuya Productions, which was originally published by Bandai Namco Entertainment. A subsidiary studio in Montreal, Canada, was announced in May 2020, adding to its more than 250 employees in France. The investment will allow Dontnod to continue self-publishing their titles and expand into China and the mobile game sector. Dontnod stated in April 2021 they plan to expand their self-publishing capabilities to third-party publishing as well, with the first planned title from Copenhagen-based studio PortaPlay. In September 2021, Dontnod made their remote work policy (Fully Remote Organization scheme) permanent for all employees.

On 31 May 2022, the company changed its name to Don't Nod. Its publishing side released its first game, Gerta: A Flame in Winter in September 2022.

Philosophy 
Guilbert said in April 2016 that the studio had cast off the ambition of making triple A games and would only see themselves devoted to independent projects, in particular, original, narrative-driven intellectual properties, which narrative director Stéphane Beauverger agreed was "part of Dontnod's DNA". The company's guiding principle is to reinvent itself with every game. For the sake of maintaining the motivation of players and publishers, the production cycle since releasing the five-year commitment Remember Me was reduced to two and a half or three years. In 2018, Guilbert said the company would pursue a co-production strategy with future publishers, as was done for Vampyr, limiting their part to forty percent. Each project begins with a designer, writer, and art director, with the occasional producer or engineer. Multiple teams work simultaneously on different projects. "Dontnod Days" are maintained for unsupervised work related to ongoing projects.

Games developed

Games published

Notes

References

External links 
 

French companies established in 2008
Companies based in Paris
Video game companies established in 2008
Video game companies of France
Video game development companies
Companies listed on Euronext Paris
Tencent
Dontnod Entertainment